The 20th Anniversary Cup (also known as the 20th Cup) was a stand-alone cup competition played to celebrate the 20th anniversary of the Israeli Declaration of Independence.

The competition was played at the start of the 1968–69 season, while the national football team was involved in the 1968 Summer Olympics football tournament, and was open to Liga Leumit clubs only.  The 16 clubs were divided into four groups of four clubs each, which were played in a double Round-robin tournament. The winner of each group advanced to the semi-finals.

The cup was won by Hapoel Petah Tikva, who had beaten Maccabi Haifa 4–1 in the final.

Group phase

Group A

Group B

Group C

Group D

Knock-out Phase

Semi-finals

Final

References
100 Years of Football 1906–2006, Elisha Shohat (Israel), 2006

Anniversary Cup
Predecessors